William Martin Hendon (November 9, 1944 – June 20, 2018) was an American author, POW/MIA activist, and two-term Republican U.S. Congressman from North Carolina's 11th District.

Political career
In 1980, Hendon ousted two-term incumbent Democrat V. Lamar Gudger to become the first Republican to represent what is now the 11th since 1929.  For the rest of the decade, Hendon's rivalry with Democrat Jamie Clarke gained national attention. In 1982, Clarke defeated Hendon's bid for re-election by less than 1,500 votes. In 1984 Hendon gained revenge by defeating Clarke's bid for re-election by just two percentage points—likely helped by Ronald Reagan's landslide victory. In their third consecutive meeting in 1986 Hendon lost to Clarke by one percentage point. Despite being encouraged to run against Clarke for a fourth time in 1988, Hendon declined.

Post-political career

His 2007 New York Times bestseller, An Enormous Crime, co-written with attorney Elizabeth Stewart, argues that American soldiers were abandoned in Indochina following the Vietnam War. In its review, Publishers Weekly stated, "controversial former North Carolina congressman Hendon and attorney Stewart make the case that the U.S. knowingly left hundreds of POWs in Vietnam and Laos in 1973, and that every presidential administration since then has covered it up." Kirkus Reviews called it "a sprawling indictment of eight U.S. Administrations.… A convincing, urgent argument."

One day prior to the release of An Enormous Crime, The Raleigh News & Observer ran a story about a passage in Douglas Brinkley's The Reagan Diaries, wherein President Ronald Reagan, following a briefing by then-Vice President George H. W. Bush, wrote that Hendon was "off his rocker" with allegations about Americans held in Vietnam. Bush's feelings aside, after Hendon was narrowly defeated (50.7% to 49.3%) in the 1986 mid-term elections, Reagan appointed him to the board of directors of the Tennessee Valley Authority. Hendon withdrew his name from consideration for the post in the face of stiff Senate Democratic opposition to his environmental record, and instead accepted a position with the pro-defense American Defense Institute. He would remain an active voice on the POW/MIA issue until his death in 2018.

Hendon died on June 20, 2018, under hospice care in Forest City, North Carolina after long illness at the age of 73.

Tenure in the United States Congress
97th United States Congress (1981–1983)
99th United States Congress (1985–1987)

References

External links 
Biography, The Biographical Directory of the United States Congress
A Finding Aid to Records Relating to American Prisoners of War and Missing in Action from the Vietnam War Era, 1960–1994, The National Archives, compiled 1996
Hanoi and Washington Officials Reneging on Promises of Joint POW/MIA Cooperation, U.S. Veteran Dispatch, February/March 1995
M.I.A. Hunter in Hanoi Chains Himself to Gate, The New York Times, June 5, 1995
Vietnam Ousts American Over the P.O.W. Issue, The New York Times, June 9, 1995
 

1944 births
2018 deaths
American political writers
American male non-fiction writers
Politicians from Asheville, North Carolina
University of Tennessee alumni
University of Tennessee faculty
Republican Party members of the United States House of Representatives from North Carolina
Activists from North Carolina
Writers from Asheville, North Carolina
Vietnam War POW/MIA activists